The term generalized logistic distribution is used as the name for several different families of probability distributions. For example, Johnson et al. list four forms, which are listed below. 

Type I has also been called the skew-logistic distribution. Type IV subsumes the other types and is obtained when applying the logit transform to beta random variates. Following the same convention as for the log-normal distribution, type IV may be referred to as the logistic-beta distribution, with reference to the standard logistic function, which is the inverse of the logit transform.  

For other families of distributions that have also been called generalized logistic distributions, see the shifted log-logistic distribution, which is a generalization of the log-logistic distribution; and the metalog ("meta-logistic") distribution, which is highly shape-and-bounds flexible and can be fit to data with linear least squares.

Definitions

The following definitions are for standardized versions of the families, which can be expanded to the full form as a location-scale family. Each is defined using either the cumulative distribution function (F) or the probability density function (ƒ), and is defined on (-∞,∞).

Type I

The corresponding probability density function is:

This type has also been called the "skew-logistic" distribution.

Type II 

The corresponding probability density function is:

Type III 

Here B is the beta function. The moment generating function for this type is

The corresponding cumulative distribution function is:

Type IV 

The moment generating function for this type is
 
This type is also called the "exponential generalized beta of the second type".

The corresponding cumulative distribution function is:

Relationship between types

Type IV is the most general form of the distribution. The Type III distribution can be obtained from Type IV by fixing . The Type II distribution can be obtained from Type IV by fixing  (and renaming  to ). The Type I distribution can be obtained from Type IV by fixing . Fixing  gives the standard logistic distribution.

Type IV (logistic-beta) properties

The Type IV generalized logistic, or logistic-beta distribution, with support  and shape parameters , has (as shown above) the probability density function (pdf):

where  is the standard logistic function. The probability density functions for three different sets of shape parameters are shown in the plot, where the distributions have been scaled and shifted to give zero means and unity variances, in order to facilitate comparison of the shapes.

Relationship with Gamma Distribution
This distribution can be obtained in terms of the gamma distribution as follows. Let  and independently,  and let . Then  is has the Type IV distribution, with parameters .

Mean, variance and skewness 
By using the logarithmic expectations of the gamma distribution, the mean and variance can be derived as:

where  is the digamma function, while  is its first derivative, also known as the trigamma function. Similarly, the skewness can be expressed in terms of the tetragamma function:

Mode
The mode (pdf maximum) can be derived by finding  where the log pdf derivative is zero:

Tail behaviour

In each of the left and right tails, one of the sigmoids in the pdf saturates to one, so that the tail is formed by the other sigmoid. Although type IV tails are heavier than those of the normal distribution (for variance ), the type IV means and variances remain finite for all . This is in contrast with the Cauchy distribution for which the mean and variance do not exist. In the log pdf plots shown here, the type IV tails are linear, the normal distribution tails are quadratic and the Cauchy tails are logarithmic.

Relationships with other distributions 
Relationships with other distributions include:
 The log-ratio of gamma variates is of type IV as detailed above. 
See beta prime distribution.
See beta distribution. The logit function,  is the inverse of the logistic function. This relationship explains the name logistic-beta for this distribution: if the logistic function is applied to logistic-beta variates, the transformed distribution is beta.

Large shape parameters

For large values of the shape parameters, the distribution becomes more Gaussian. This is demonstrated in the pdf and log pdf plots here.

Random variate generation
Since random sampling from the gamma and beta distributions are readily available on many software platforms, the above relationships with those distributions can be used to generate variates from the type IV distribution.

Generalization with location and scale parameters 
A flexible, four-parameter family can be obtained by adding location and scale parameters.
.

The mean and variance are now:

Maximum likelihood parameter estimation
Since the (logarithms of) the logistic and beta functions are readily available in software packages with automatic differentiation, gradients of the log-pdf with respect to the parameters can be easily obtained, so that gradient-based numerical optimization can be used to make maximum likelihood estimates of the parameters of this distribution.

See also
Champernowne distribution, another generalization of the logistic distribution.

References

Continuous distributions